The Association of American Publishers (AAP) is the national trade association of the American book publishing industry. AAP lobbies for book, journal, and education publishers in the United States. AAP members include most of the major commercial publishers in the United States, as well as smaller and non-profit publishers, university presses and scholarly societies.

Former U.S. congresswoman Patricia Schroeder served as the association's CEO from 1997 until 2009, taking over the role from two time U.S. Ambassador and Assistant Secretary of State Nicholas A. Veliotes. On May 1, 2009, former U.S. congressman Tom Allen took over as president and CEO. In January 2017, former U.S. Register of Copyrights Maria Pallante became President and CEO of the organization.

Activities
AAP members publish hardcover and paperback books in every field, educational materials for the elementary, secondary, postsecondary, and professional markets, scholarly journals, computer software, and electronic products and services.

The association's core programs deal with advocacy and supporting laws and regulations that “incentivize the publication of creative expression, professional content, and learning solutions,” according to the Chair at the 2018 Annual Meeting. Other current and previous focus are: intellectual property; new technology and digital issues of concern to publishers; the freedom to read, censorship and libel; the freedom to publish; funding for education and libraries; postal rates and regulations; tax and trade policy; and international copyright enforcement.

The association tracks publisher revenue on a monthly and annual basis with its StatShot Monthly and StatShot Annual programs. AAP also produces the comprehensive statistical surveys for the education sectors (prek-12 and higher education).

AAP also honors the very best in professional and scholarly publishing with PROSE Awards, which draws attention to distinguished books, journals, and electronic content. The awards have been judged by peer publishers, librarians, and medical professionals since 1976.

In late 2019, AAP sued Audible for their Captions feature, in which machine-generated text would be displayed alongside the audio narration. The lawsuit was settled in early 2020, with Audible agreeing not to implement the Captions feature without obtaining express permission.

Controversy
AAP was criticized after it contracted Eric Dezenhall's crisis management firm to promote its position regarding the open access movement. Schroeder told The Washington Post'''' the association hired Dezenhall when members realized they needed help. "We thought we were angels for a long time and we didn't need PR firms."

AAP has released press statements to support four of its members in the case of Hachette v Internet Archive'' (IA). President Maria A. Pallante said of the case, "As the complaint outlines, by illegally copying and distributing online a stunning number of literary works each day, IA displays an abandon shared only by the world’s most egregious pirate sites." This action has been opposed by the Electronic Frontier Foundation, Public Knowledge, and the Association of Research Libraries.

See also

 American Publishers Association
 International Publishers Association
 Society for Scholarly Publishing
 Books in the United States

References

External links
 
 Finding aid to Association of American Publishers records at Columbia University. Rare Book & Manuscript Library.

Publishing companies of the United States
Publishing-related professional associations